Jerry Beck (born February 9, 1955, in New York City) is an American animation historian, author, blogger, and video producer.

Beck wrote or edited several books on classic American animation and classic characters, including The 50 Greatest Cartoons (1994), The Animated Movie Guide (2005), Not Just Cartoons: Nicktoons! (2007), The Flintstones: The Official Guide to the Cartoon Classic (2011), The Hanna-Barbera Treasury: Rare Art Mementos from Your Favorite Cartoon Classics (2007), The SpongeBob SquarePants Experience: A Deep Dive into the World of Bikini Bottom (2013), Pink Panther: The Ultimate Guide (2005), and Looney Tunes and Merrie Melodies: A Complete Illustrated Guide to the Warner Bros. Cartoons (with Will Friedwald, 1989) alongside The 100 Greatest Looney Tunes Cartoons (2010). He is also an authority on the making of modern films, with his books detailing the art of Mr. Peabody and Sherman, DreamWorks' Madagascar, and Bee Movie. Beck is also an entertainment industry consultant for TV and home entertainment productions and releases related to classic cartoons and operates the blog "Cartoon Research". He appears frequently as a documentary subject and audio commentator on releases of A&E's Cartoons Go to War as well as DVD collections of Looney Tunes, Popeye the Sailor, and Woody Woodpecker cartoons, on which he serves as consultant and curator.

Career

Writing
Early in his career, Beck collaborated with film historian Leonard Maltin on his book Of Mice and Magic: A History of American Animated Cartoons, Revised and Updated Edition (1980).

In 1987, Beck was instrumental in the creation of Animation Magazine. He went on to write for other magazines including: Variety, The Hollywood Reporter, The Whole Toon Catalog, Animation Blast, Animator, Wild Cartoon Kingdom and Animation World Network.

Beck wrote or edited several books on classic American animation and classic characters, including The 50 Greatest Cartoons (1994), The Animated Movie Guide (2005), Not Just Cartoons: Nicktoons! (2007), The Flintstones: The Official Guide to the Cartoon Classic (2011), The Hanna-Barbera Treasury: Rare Art Mementos from Your Favorite Cartoon Classics (2007), The SpongeBob SquarePants Experience: A Deep Dive into the World of Bikini Bottom (2013), Pink Panther: The Ultimate Guide (2005), and Looney Tunes and Merrie Melodies: A Complete Illustrated Guide to the Warner Bros. Cartoons (with Will Friedwald, 1989) alongside The 100 Greatest Looney Tunes Cartoons (2010). He is also an authority on the making of modern films, with his books detailing the art of Mr. Peabody and Sherman, DreamWorks' Madagascar, and Bee Movie.

In 2004, Beck and fellow animation historian and writer Amid Amidi co-founded the blog Cartoon Brew, which focused primarily on current animation productions and news. Beck sold his co-ownership in Cartoon Brew in February 2013 and started an IndieWire blog, Animation Scoop, for reports on current animation while continuing to write about classic animation at Cartoon Research.

Teaching
In the 1990s, Beck taught courses on the art of animation at UCLA, NYU, and The School of Visual Arts. Through 2018 he also taught animation history at Woodbury University in Burbank, California. As of 2020, Beck teaches in the Character Animation department of CalArts School of Film/Video.

Producing and consulting
Jerry Beck co-produced or was a consultant on many home entertainment compilations of Looney Tunes, MGM Cartoons, Disney Home Video, Betty Boop, and others.

In 1989, he co-founded Streamline Pictures and brought anime films, Akira, Vampire Hunter D, and Hayao Miyazaki's Castle in the Sky to the United States. He also compiled collections of cartoons from Warner Bros., Woody Woodpecker, and the Fleischer Studios.

As vice president of Nickelodeon Movies, he helped develop The Rugrats Movie (1998) and Mighty Mouse.

In 2006, Beck created and produced an animated pilot for Frederator Studios at Nickelodeon. That cartoon, Hornswiggle, aired on Nicktoons Network in 2008 as part of the Random! Cartoons series.

Volunteering
In 1993, Jerry Beck became a founding member of the Cartoon Network advisory board and he currently serves as Vice President of the ASIFA-Hollywood board.

Speaking
On a regular basis Beck moderates panels at various venues (festivals, conventions, premieres, museums, screenings, etc.) along with hosting programs/retrospectives of classic cartoons at same. In the past this included shows at the now shuttered Cinefamily and Cartoon Dump monthly live Hollywood performance.

His presentations include:
 Worst Cartoons Ever! program at San Diego Comic-Con
 Greatest Cartoons Ever! program the day after Christmas at the Alex Theatre (co-hosted by Frank Gladstone)
 Monthly Cartoon Club at the New Beverly Cinema
 A semi-annual show at the Old Town Music Hall

Personal life
On June 25, 2021, Beck married voice actress Cheryl Chase, his girlfriend of 33 years.

Bibliography 

Maltin, L. & Beck, Jerry (1980). Of Mice and Magic: A History of American Animated Cartoons. New York: Penguin.
Friedwald, W., & Beck, Jerry. (1981). The Warner Brothers Cartoons. Metuchen, NJ: Scarecrow Press.
Beck, Jerry, & Friedwald, W. (1989). Looney Tunes and Merrie Melodies: A Complete Illustrated Guide to the Warner Bros. Cartoons. New York, NY: Holt.
Beck, Jerry. (1994). The Fifty Greatest Cartoons: As Selected by 1,000 Animation Professionals. Atlanta: Turner Pub.
Beck, Jerry, & Friedwald, W. (1997). Warner Bros., Animation Art: The Characters, The Creators, The Limited Editions. Miami, FL: Warner Bros.
Beck, Jerry. (2003). Looney Tunes: The Ultimate Visual Guide. London: Dorling Kindersley.
Beck, Jerry. (2003). Outlaw Animation: Cutting-edge Cartoons From the Spike & Mike Festivals. New York: Harry N. Abrams.
Beck, Jerry. (2004). Animation Art From Pencil Ti Pixel, The History of Cartoon Anime & CGI. Harper & Row.
Beck, Jerry. (2005). Pink Panther: The Ultimate Guide to the Coolest Cat in Town. New York: DK Publishing.
Sigall, M. & Beck, J. (2005). Forward for: Living Life Inside the Lines: Tales From the Golden Age of Animation. Jackson, MS: University Press of Mississippi.
Beck, Jerry. (2005). The Animated Movie Guide / The Ultimate Illustrated Reference to Cartoon, Stop-motion, and Computer-generated Feature Films. Chicago: Chicago Review Press.
Beck, Jerry. (2007). Nicktoons! New York, NY: Melcher Media.
Beck, Jerry. (2007). The Art of Bee Movie. San Francisco: Chronicle Books.
Cabarga, L. & Beck, J. (2007). Introduction for: Casper the Friendly Ghost. Milwaukie, Or.: Dark Horse.
Cabarga, L. & Beck, J. (2008). Introduction for: Hot Stuff. Milwaukie, Or.: Dark Horse.
Cabarga, L. & Beck, J.  (2008). Introduction for: Baby Huey: The Baby Giant. Milwaukie, Or.: Dark Horse.
Beck, Jerry. (2008). The Art and Making of Madagascar. San Rafael, CA: Insight Editions.
Beck, Jerry. (2008). The Flintstones. San Rafael, CA: Insight Editions.
Beck, Jerry. (2008). Tom and Jerry. San Rafael, CA: Insight Editions.
Beck, Jerry. (2009). The Hanna-Barbera Treasury. San Rafael, CA: Insight Editions.
Beck, Jerry. (2011). The Flintstones: The Official Guide to the Cartoon Classic. Philadelphia, PA: Running Press.
Beck, Jerry. (2013). SpongeBob SquarePants Experience. Insight Editions, Div Of Palac.
Beck, Jerry, (2014). Essay for: Felix the Cat Paintings: A Collection of Paintings From the Prolific Imagination of the Felix the Cat Guy. San Diego, CA: IDW Publishing.
Beck, Jerry, Burrell, T., Ward, T., & Minkoff, R. (2014). The Art of Mr. Peabody & Sherman. San Rafael, CA: Insight Editions.
Beck, Jerry, & Maltin, L. (2020). The 100 Greatest Looney Tunes Cartoons. San Rafael, CA: Insight Editions.

Awards
In 2008, Beck was the recipient of the June Foray Award. In 2014, Beck received the Independent Publisher Book Award for Popular Culture. In 2015, Beck was the recipient of the Comic-Con International Inkpot Award. Beck was the 2019 honoree of the Los Angeles Animation Festival.

References

External links
 CartoonResearch.com
 Animation Scoop.com
 

1955 births
Historians of animation
American film historians
American male writers
Living people
Writers from New York City
American male bloggers
American bloggers
21st-century American non-fiction writers
Historians from New York (state)
Inkpot Award winners